Michael Anderson,  (born 12 July 1987) is an Australian Paralympic swimmer who has won gold, silver and bronze medals at the  three Paralympics from 2008 to 2016.

Personal
Anderson has nerve damage to his leg caused by meningitis and a hearing impairment. He was born and grew up in Bellingen in the Northern Rivers. He moved to the Gold Coast to study for a Bachelor of Sport Management degree at Griffith University.

Career

Anderson made his international debut at the 2005 Deaflympics in Melbourne where he finished sixth in the 50m backstroke.

At the 2006 IPC Swimming World Championships in Durban, South Africa Anderson won a silver medal in the Men's 100 m Backstroke S10 event. He competed in three events at the 2008 Beijing Games, winning a silver medal in the Men's 100 m Backstroke S10 event. He battled shoulder injuries around the time of the 2008 Beijing Games.  He competed at the 2010 IPC Swimming World Championships in Eindhoven, Netherlands and did not win a medal. He has been an Australian Institute of Sport paralympic swimming scholarship holder.

At the 2012 London Paralympics, Anderson won a gold medal in the 4x100 m freestyle relay and a bronze medal in the 4x100 m medley relay. He also participated in the S10 class of the Men's 100 m Backstroke, 100 m Freestyle and 50 m Freestyle events. He was awarded an Order of Australia Medal  in the 2014 Australia Day Honours "for service to sport as a Gold Medallist at the London 2012 Paralympic Games."

At the 2015 IPC Swimming World Championships, Glasgow, Scotland, he won a bronze medal in the Men's  Freestyle Relay 34pts as a heat swimmer. He finished fourth in the Men's  Medley Relay 34pts, sixth in the Men's 100m Backstroke S10, tenth in the Men's 50m Freestyle S10 and eleventh in the Men's 100m Freestyle S10.

In 2015, he was coached by Jan Cameron at the University of the Sunshine Coast and is a Queensland Academy of Sport Scholarship holder.

At the 2016 Rio Paralympic Games, Anderson competed in three events. He finished sixth in the final of Men's 100m backstroke S10, but didn't progress to the finals in Men's 50m Freestyle S10 and Men's 100m Freestyle S10.

References

External links

 
 
 
 

Male Paralympic swimmers of Australia
Swimmers at the 2008 Summer Paralympics
Swimmers at the 2012 Summer Paralympics
Swimmers at the 2016 Summer Paralympics
Medalists at the 2008 Summer Paralympics
Medalists at the 2012 Summer Paralympics
Paralympic gold medalists for Australia
Paralympic silver medalists for Australia
Paralympic bronze medalists for Australia
Australian Institute of Sport Paralympic swimmers
Sportsmen from New South Wales
Recipients of the Medal of the Order of Australia
1987 births
Living people
S10-classified Paralympic swimmers
Medalists at the World Para Swimming Championships
Paralympic medalists in swimming
Australian male freestyle swimmers
Australian male backstroke swimmers
21st-century Australian people